The 2011 Arab Youth Volleyball Championship was held in Hurghada, Egypt from 20 July to 27 July 2011.

Pools composition

Pool A

|}

|}

Pool B

|}

|}

Final round

Classification 5–8 places

Seventh place match

|}

Fifth place match

|}

Championship bracket

Semifinals

|}

Bronze medal match

|}

Final

|}

Final standing

Awards
MVP:  Oussama Mrika
Best Spiker:  Mohammed Adel
Best Blocker:  Rashid Ahmed Al Assily
Best Server:  Mahmoud Al Afiya
Best Setter:  Khaled Ben Slimene
Best Receiver:  Ali Hassan Sultan
Best Libero:  Mohammed Redha

References

External links
2011 Arab Youth Championship Summary (Tunisian Volleyball Federation) 

Arab Youth Volleyball Championship
Arab Youth Volleyball Championship
2011 in Egyptian sport
Hurghada
International volleyball competitions hosted by Egypt